The Taichung City Government is the municipal government of Taichung, Taiwan.

History

Taichū City Government was established by the Governor-General of Taiwan and the Japanese colonial authorities on 1 October 1920.  Following the handover of Taiwan from Japan to the Republic of China, Taichung had been reconstituted as a provincial city government on 25 October 1945. Taichung City merged with Taichung County to become a special municipality  on 25 December 2010.

Building
The first Taichung city hall, known as Taichung Shiyakusho, was constructed in 1911, when Taiwan was under Japanese rule. It has been turned into a cultural center since 2016. The current Taichung City Hall was completed and opened on 10 October 2010.

Organizations

Bureaus
 Agriculture Bureau
 Civil Affairs Bureau
 Construction Bureau
 Cultural Affairs Bureau
 Economic Development Bureau
 Education Bureau
 Environmental Protection Bureau
 Finance Bureau
 Fire Bureau
 Health Bureau
 Information Bureau
 Labor Affairs Bureau
 Land Administration Bureau
 Legal Affairs Bureau
 Local Tax Bureau
 Social Affairs Bureau
 Tourism and Travel Bureau
 Transportation Bureau
 Urban Development Bureau
 Water Resources Bureau

Offices
 Budget, Accounting and Statistics Office
 Central District Household Registration Office
 Civil Service Ethics Office
 Civil Service Training Center
 Council for Hakka Affairs
 Daya District Office
 Department of Personnel
 Indigenous People Commission
 Information Management Center
 Police Department
 Research, Development and Evaluation Commission
 Secretariat

Mayors

See also
 Taichung City Council

References

External links

 

1945 establishments in Taiwan
Government agencies established in 1945
Local governments of the Republic of China